Hillside School may refer to:

United States
 Hillside Elementary School, in Berkeley, California
 Hillside High School (California) in Upland, California
 Hillside School, a preparatory school in Marlborough, Massachusetts for boys in grades 5-9
 Hillside Middle School (Northville, Michigan)
 Hillside High School (New Jersey) in Hillside, New Jersey
 Hillside High School (Durham, North Carolina) in Durham, North Carolina
 Hillside School, a private school for students in grades 1–8 with learning disabilities in Upper Macungie Township, Pennsylvania

United Kingdom
 Hillside Special School, in Portslade, Brighton and Hove
 Hillside High School, Bootle in Bootle, Merseyside
 Hillside Special School, in Sudbury, Suffolk
 Hillside School, Malvern - former preparatory school in Malvern, Worcestershire

Canada
 Hillside Senior Public School, in Mississauga, Ontario